The Spanish Cobras is a primarily, but not exclusively,  Latino gang started by Puerto Rican teenagers in Chicago during the late 1950s. The Insane Spanish Cobra Nation are members of the Folks alliance and considered the second-largest Latino Folk gang on the north and west side, with the Maniac Latin Disciples being the first.

The Spanish Cobras landed in the Humboldt Park neighborhood at Maplewood/Campbell & Potomac sometime during the 1960’s. In the early 1970’s a young teen named Richard “King Cobra” Medina fought to become leader of the gang as they took over the intersection of Evergreen & Washtenaw. King Cobra, or KC, started a Young Cobras faction who attacked other gangs’ turf and soon claimed Artesian & Potomac “A-Town”, and Mozart & Cortland “Sin City”. 
  
The Spanish Cobras were introduced to the world when they stabbed a Latin King during the 1977 Puerto Rican Parade. That was the catalyst for the Humboldt Park Riots. The Kings retaliated later that day, and as the two gangs fought publicly, Chicago Police shot into the crowd killing two innocent bystanders, causing the community to riot.

The Insane Spanish Cobras made headlines again in Spring 1979 during their bloody war with the Insane Unknowns. This resulted in over 10 homicides and a public response from Mayor Jane Byrne. 

Before his murder at 20 years old in a drive-by, KC expanded the Spanish Cobras into many sections and made them large around the Division & Maplewood area. They branched into West Humboldt Park at Ridgeway & Thomas, and took over the hoods of LeMoyne & Springfield and Springfield & Hirsch which branched into Avers & Hirsch “Westown Cobras”.

In the 1980s, according to criminologist John Haggerdon's book Insane the Chicago Way, "What began to take shape was the daring plan of gang leaders incarcerated in Statesville—Fernando "Prince Fernie" Zayas from the Maniac Latin Disciples, Anibal "Tuffy C" Santiago from the Insane Spanish Cobras, and David Ayala from the Two Sixers—to create a local Latino Mafia"

Spanish Cobra sets aggressively opened across the Northwest side around Kilbourn & Fullerton Avenue “The Killing Fields”, the notorious Fullerton & Tripp and along Central Park Ave in Logan Square. 
Monticello & Cortland "Murder City" branched into Lawndale & Cortland. 

In the sumner of 1990, the Francis & Stave YLO Cobras attacked the Simon City Royals at Kosciusko Park in a series of fist fights and shootouts, taking over “Koz Park” and opening Schubert & Avers. 

The Spanish Cobras and Latin Disciples were strong allies throughout the 1970s and 1980s, but began deadly turf wars over drug territory around 1993. By 1996, the war made the Chicago Tribune. 
That same year, in retaliation for the murder of a high ranking member, West-Town Cobras shot up a Latin King wedding resulting in casualties. The shooting was caught on videotape then broadcast on local news stations. This increased the pressure on law enforcement to go after the gang. 

After a nine month undercover narcotics investigation, in January 1998 the Chicago Police Department arrested 31 Spanish Cobras in "Operation: Mongoose", including some gang leaders. This resulted in the closure of a Cobra section.

As head of the Insane Familia, the Spanish Cobras took the alliance of Insane Deuces, Insane Dragons, Orchestra Albany and others to war against the Maniacs and Almighty Folks. In the early 2000’s the Lawndale & Cortland Cobras violently removed the MLD’s from North Ave & Lawndale. 

Today, the Chicago neighborhoods with the strongest active Insane and YLO Spanish Cobra presence are: 
Humboldt Park,  Hermosa, Logan Square, Belmont-Cragin, Albany Park and Kelvyn Park. They are also found in the suburbs of Waukegan, Bensenville and Cicero, with a small presence in the McKinley Park area on the south side (34th & Western). Known to operate in other parts of Illinois, as well as Milwaukee, Racine and Kenosha in Wisconsin, and Detroit. They are quite large in Flint, Michigan. 
Law enforcement has also reported Spanish Cobras in Ohio, Connecticut and South Florida.

References

https://m.chicagoreader.com/chicago/insane-way-john-hagedorn-latino-gangs-sgd/Content?oid=20511448

https://www.chicagotribune.com/news/ct-xpm-1996-08-29-9608290299-story.html

Further reading
 

1960s establishments in Illinois
Latino street gangs
Hispanic-American gangs
Folk Nation
Gangs in Chicago
Gangs in Wisconsin
https://blockclubchicago.org/2019/05/06/gang-war-to-blame-for-string-of-shootings-in-hermosa-west-logan-square-police-say/